Bou Thang (15 August 1938 – 12 September 2019) was a Cambodian politician, Senator, Chairman of the Committee Interior and Defense of the Senate (term 2012-2018). He belonged to the Cambodian People's Party and was elected to represent Ratanakiri Province in the National Assembly of Cambodia in 2003. Thang was a member of the Tampuan ethnic group.

References

Bibliography

 

1938 births
2019 deaths
People's Republic of Kampuchea
Kampuchean United Front for National Salvation politicians
Members of the National Assembly (Cambodia)
Members of the Senate (Cambodia)
Defence ministers of Cambodia
Cambodian People's Party politicians